State Coroner could refer to:

 Coroner an officer of law responsible for investigating deaths
 State Coroner (TV series) an Australian television series on Network ten